Blacklisted is the unofficial sixth and final studio album by American musician Aaron Carter. It was released on November 7, 2022, two days after his death at age 34. Blacklisted was originally scheduled to be released on Carter's 35th birthday, December 7, 2022, but was issued by the producers without the approval of Carter's management to "honor him and share his exceptional artistry with his fans around the world".

Carter's management team called the album's release, "Scars" being issued as a single and an unrelated book about Carter's life "obscenely disrespectful and unauthorized releases" and "heartless money grabs and attention seeking".

In November 2022, the album was removed from streaming services for being released without permission by Carter's management.

Track listing 
 "So Much to Say" – 3:06
 "Blame It on Me" – 3:23
 "She Just Wanna Ride" (featuring 3D Friends)  – 2:43
 "Reload the Wesson" (featuring Twista) – 2:32
 "Scars" (featuring 3D Friends) – 2:24
 "Back to Life" (featuring 3D Friends) – 2:50
 "Never Say Sorry" (featuring 3D Friends) – 4:09
 "City of Dreams" – 3:06
 "Ridin' on Em" (featuring Seejay and Rocky Luciano) – 1:54
 "Time in a Bottle" (Jim Croce cover) – 2:16

Personnel 
 Aaron Carter – vocals, songwriting, engineering, production

References 

2022 albums
Aaron Carter albums
Albums published posthumously
Unauthorized albums